The 2023 Quincy Hawks men's volleyball team represents Quincy University in the 2023 NCAA Division I & II men's volleyball season. The Hawks, led by 2nd year head coach Caren Kemner, play their home games at Pepsi Arena. The Hawks are members of the Midwestern Intercollegiate Volleyball Association and were picked to finish eighth in the MIVA in the preseason poll.

Roster

Schedule

 *-Indicates conference match.
 Times listed are Central Time Zone.

Broadcasters
Limestone: No commentary
King: Hailee Blankenship & Lydia Buchanan
Lincoln Memorial: No commentary
Charleston (WV): No commentary
Maryville:
Missouri S&T: 
St. Ambrose: 
Grand View: 
Loyola Chicago: 
Purdue Fort Wayne: 
Lewis: 
McKendree: 
Ohio State: 
Ball State: 
Milwaukee School of Engineering: 
Lindenwood: 
Missouri Valley College: 
Cornerstone: 
Missouri S&T: 
Maryville: 
Lindenwood: 
Ball State: 
Ohio State:
Purdue Fort Wayne: 
Loyola Chicago: 
McKendree: 
Lewis:

Honors
To be filled in upon completion of the season.

References

2023 in sports in Illinois
2023 NCAA Division I & II men's volleyball season
Quincy